In The Night Tour was the seventh concert tour by Brazilian pop recording artist Kelly Key to promote concerts only in GLBT nightclubs.

Development 
The tour (without an album basis) brought the singer's biggest hits in remixed versions by DJ especially for the gay community, as well as covers and new songs added during the tour. The shows promoted by Kelly Key performed only indoors as nightclubs as discos and nightclubs as a way to fit the work done by singers like Wanessa and Lorena Simpson. The tour has gogoboys and special effects on stage and screen.

Set List 
Act 1: Welcome to... In The Night Tour
 01. "K Diferente"
 02. "Só Quero Ficar"
 03. "Anjo"
 04. "O Amor e o Poder"
 05. "Adoleta" (remix)
 06. "Pegue e Puxe" (remix)
 07. "I Deserve It"
 08. "Poker Face" (Lady Gaga cover)

Act 2: Só Para Maiores (en: Only for people over age)
 09. "Barbie Girl" (remix)
 10. "Baba" (remix)
 11. "Escondido"
 Intro: "Summer Lie" (Eliza G song)
 12. "Shake Boom"
 13. "O Problema é Meu"
 14. "Cachorrinho" (remix)
 15. "Pegue e Puxe"
 16. "4 Minutes" (Madonna cover)

Additional songs 
 "Chic, Chic" (performer only in Brasília)

Opening acts 
 DJ Hellen Chic (Brasília)

Dates

References

External links
 Official Website

2011 concert tours